The 1938 Giro d'Italia was the 26th edition of the Giro d'Italia, organized and sponsored by the newspaper La Gazzetta dello Sport. The race was won by the Italian rider Giovanni Valetti of the Fréjus team, with fellow Italians Ezio Cecchi and Severino Canavesi coming in second and third respectively.

Participants

Of the 94 riders that began the Giro d'Italia on 7 May, 50 of them made it to the finish in Milan on 29 May. Riders were allowed to ride as a member of a team or group; 61 riders competed as part of a team, while the remaining 33 competed as a part of a group. The nine teams that partook in the race were: Bianchi, Dei, Fréjus, Ganna, Gloria-Ambrosiana, Lygie-Settebello, Legnano, Olympia, and Wolsit-Binda. The teams ranged from six to eight riders each. There were also seven groups, made up of three to five riders each, that participated in the race. Those groups were: U. C. Modenese, Il Littoriale, La Voce di Mantova, U.S. Azzini, U.S. Canelli, Dopolavoro Mater, and Gruppo A.

The peloton was composed primarily of Italian riders. The field featured one former Giro d'Italia winners with Francesco Camusso who won the race in 1931. Reigning champion Gino Bartali did not enter the race because the Italian government ordered him to race the Tour de France instead. Other notable Italian riders included Olimpio Bizzi, Giovanni Valetti, Ezio Cecchi, and Giuseppe Olmo. Swiss rider Leo Amberg who placed high at the 1936 and 1937 Tours de France competed in the race.

Route and stages

Classification leadership

The leader of the general classification – calculated by adding the stage finish times of each rider – wore a pink jersey. This classification is the most important of the race, and its winner is considered as the winner of the Giro.

In the mountains classification, the race organizers selected different mountains that the route crossed and awarded points to the riders who crossed them first.

The winner of the team classification was determined by adding the finish times of the best three cyclists per team together and the team with the lowest total time was the winner. If a team had fewer than three riders finish, they were not eligible for the classification. The group classification was decided in the same manner, but the classification was exclusive to the competing groups.

The rows in the following table correspond to the jerseys awarded after that stage was run.

Final standings

General classification

Isolati classification

Mountains classification

Team classification

Group classification

References

Notes

Citations

1938
Giro d'Italia
Giro d'Italia
Giro d'Italia